Karatalovo (Qaratal) is a rural locality (a selo) in Chekmagushevsky District, Bashkortostan, Russia. The population was 212 as of 2010. There are 2 streets.

Geography 
Karatalovo is located 40 km southwest of Chekmagush (the district's administrative centre) by road. Novopuchkakovo is the nearest rural locality.

References 

Rural localities in Chekmagushevsky District